Benoy Krishna Konar (1930-14 September 2014) was an Indian politician who started as a peasant leader of the Communist Party of India (Marxist) and went to be a three time MLA in the West Bengal Legislative Assembly.

Benoy Krishna was born in 1930 in an affluent family of farmers in Memari in Purba Bardhaman district. He was younger brother of Hare Krishna Konar,"who pioneered the land reforms movement in Bengal."

He joined the undivided Communist Party of India in 1948. He was a leading figure in the militant peasants' movement in West Bengal during the 1960s and early 1970s,
He was the president of the West Bengal and central units of the All India Kisan Sabha, the peasants’ front organisation of the CPI(M).

He was directly involved in the Sainbari murder.

He was elected to the West Bengal Legislative Assembly from the Memari (Vidhan Sabha constituency) in 1969, 1971 and 1977. His wife, Maharani Konar, was elected from the same constituency in 1982, 1987 and 1991.

He was known for making caustic remarks against the Trinamool Congress and its chief Mamata Banerjee which had drawn flak even from allies during Singur and Nandigram agitations. Konar had also taken potshots against the then West Bengal Governor, Gopalkrishna Gandhi, after the Nadigram killing in 2007.

He died at Kolkata on 14 September 2014 after a prolonged illness.

References

Communist Party of India (Marxist) politicians from West Bengal
West Bengal MLAs 1969–1971
West Bengal MLAs 1971–1972
West Bengal MLAs 1977–1982
People from Purba Bardhaman district
1930 births
2014 deaths